Saint Pierre and Miquelon is a French overseas collectivity in the Western Hemisphere and the Northern Hemisphere.  It consists of an island archipelago, off the coast of Newfoundland, near North America.  The collectivity shares a maritime boundary with Canada.

Location
Saint Pierre and Miquelon is situated south of Newfoundland in the Gulf of Saint Lawrence in the North Atlantic Ocean. The islands are even closer to the long Burin Peninsula, which is situated just  to the east.

Physical geography
Saint Pierre and Miquelon is an archipelago of eight islands, Saint-Pierre (25 km2) and Miquelon-Langlade (216 km2) being the major ones. Collectively the area of the islands is  242 km2, which is about the size of Brooklyn in New York City. The total coastline is 120 km. The territory also includes the surrounding fishing areas in the North Atlantic Ocean.

Saint-Pierre
The island of Saint-Pierre is surrounded to the south-east by smaller dependencies, Petit Colombier, Île aux Marins, Île aux Pigeons  and Île aux Vainqueurs, and Grand Colombier to the north. These islands have all been inhabited at one time or another.  The settlement of Saint Pierre on Saint Pierre Island is the largest settlement in Saint Pierre and Miquelon.

St. Pierre is separated from Miquelon-Langlade by a  strait with very fierce currents. Fishermen call this section of ocean "The Mouth of Hell". The waters around these islands are very treacherous, and there have been over 600 shipwrecks along the coasts of the islands. The terrain is also described as mostly barren rock.

Miquelon-Langlade
The island(s) of Miquelon-Langlade consists of three formerly separate islands Miquelon (110 km2), Langlade (91 km2) and Le Cap. 
In the 18th century, an isthmus of sand called La Dune was formed naturally between Miquelon and Langlade. The isthmus was reinforced by hand with sand and Quaternary deposits to what is now a  sand dune. Along the isthmus, there are over 500 wrecked ships.

What was originally the island Miquelon is now also called Grande Miquelon while Petite Miquelon refers to Langlade. The settlement of Miquelon lies at the junction of the northwest corner of Miquelon Island and Le Cap.

Climate 

The climate is very damp and windy and winters are harsh and long. The spring and early summer are foggy and cool. Late summer and early fall are sunny. Winds pick up during spring and autumn.

Environment
Seals and other wildlife can be found in the Grand Barachois lagoon of Miquelon. Every spring, whales migrating to Greenland are visible off the coasts of Miquelon and St Pierre.

Trilobite fossils have been found on Langlade. There were a number of stone pillars off the island coasts called "L'anse aux Soldats" that have been eroded away and disappeared in the 1970s.

Maritime claims:
exclusive economic zone:

territorial sea:

Elevation extremes:
lowest point:
Atlantic Ocean 0 m
highest point:
Morne de la Grande Montagne 240 m

Natural resources:
fish, deepwater ports

Land use:
arable land:
13%
permanent crops:
0%
permanent pastures:
0%
forests and woodland:
4%
other:
83% (1993 est.)

Natural hazards:
persistent fog throughout the year can be a maritime hazard

Environment - current issues:
The fishing beds have been overfished, and may or may not recover.

Geography - note:
vegetation scanty

See also
Canada–France Maritime Boundary Case
List of airports in Saint Pierre and Miquelon
List of cities in Saint-Pierre and Miquelon
List of islands of Saint Pierre and Miquelon
List of rivers of Saint Pierre and Miquelon
Appalachian Mountains Overview

Notes

External links
"Saint Pierre and Miquelon" CIA Factbook 2016